Balo may refer to:

People
Mario Balotelli, Italian football player
Tamás Báló, Hungarian soccer player
Zoltán Baló, Hungarian military officer

Other
Balo (instrument), an African musical instrument
Balo concentric sclerosis, a borderline form of multiple sclerosis
Malka Balo, a woreda (administrative division) in the Oromia Region of Ethiopia